The Blonde d'Aquitaine is a modern French breed of large domestic beef cattle. It was created in 1962 by merging three blonde draught breeds of south-western France, the Blonde des Pyrénées, the Blonde de Quercy and the Garonnaise. Since about 1970, it has been selectively bred specifically for beef production. It is the third-most numerous beef breed of France, after the Charolais and the Limousin. It has been exported to many countries round the world.

History 

The Blonde d'Aquitaine breed was created in 1962 by merging three blonde breeds of south-western France, the Blonde de Quercy, the Garonnaise and the Blonde des Pyrénées. All three were principally draught breeds. The Garonnaise had been numerous in Aquitaine – 400,000 head were recorded in 1880; a herd-book was started in 1898. The Blonde des Pyrénées was itself an amalgam of several other breeds, including the Béarnaise, the Race d'Urt, and the Basquiaise; its herd-book was started in 1920, the same year as that of the Blonde de Quercy.

The Blonde d'Aquitaine includes almost all the traditional blonde cattle breeds of southern France, although remnant populations of a few of them have allowed them to be reconstituted. The moving force behind the creation of the breed was Raphaël Trémouille, a veterinary surgeon and member of the lower chamber of the French parliament. From about 1970, concerted efforts were made to improve the beef production attributes of the breed.

The Blonde d'Aquitaine is the third beef breed of France by numbers, after the Charolais and the Limousin. In 2013 there were about 560,000 head in more than 18,000 farms. The Blonde d'Aquitaine has been exported to many countries of the world, including all countries of the European Union. It is much used for cross-breeding in Oceania and in Eastern Europe, and has shown particular promise when crossed with zebuine cattle breeds in South America.

Characteristics 

The Blonde d'Aquitaine is wheat- or cream-coloured, varying from a dark to very light fawn; the surround of the eyes and the area round the muzzle is paler. The skin is white, and the muzzle and mucous areas pale.

Use 

The Blonde d'Aquitaine is raised exclusively for beef, whether purebred or cross-bred. Carcass yield is about

References 

Beef cattle breeds
Cattle breeds originating in France